Christiania is an extinct genus of prehistoric brachiopods in the family Christianiidae.

Species  
Christiania aseptata - Christiania bilobata - Christiania dalarnensis - Christiania hastata - Christiania hollii - Christiania holtedahli - Christiania perrugata - Christiania portlocki - Christiania proclivis - Christiania subquadrata - Christiania sulcata - Christiania tenuicincta - Christiania trentonensis

References

External links 

 Christiania at fossilworks.org

Prehistoric brachiopod genera
Strophomenida
Paleozoic life of British Columbia
Paleozoic life of Quebec